Collection: 1973–2012 is a compilation album by Bruce Springsteen released on Columbia in 2013 containing 18 tracks spanning forty years of Springsteen's musical career. Fourteen of the songs on the album are credited to Springsteen as a solo act and four (namely "Rosalita (Come Out Tonight)", "Hungry Heart", "Born in the U.S.A.", and "Dancing in the Dark") are credited to the formation Bruce Springsteen & The E Street Band. Two of the tracks, namely "Badlands" and "The Promised Land", were remastered for the compilation edition.

Track listing
All songs written by Bruce Springsteen, except where noted.

 "Rosalita (Come Out Tonight)" (credited to Bruce Springsteen & The E Street Band) (7:01)
 "Thunder Road" (4:48)
 "Born to Run" (4:30)
 "Badlands" (4:04)
 "The Promised Land" (4:29)
 "Hungry Heart" (credited to Bruce Springsteen & The E Street Band) (3:19)
 "Atlantic City" (3:56)
 "Born in the U.S.A." (credited to Bruce Springsteen & The E Street Band) (4:39)
 "Dancing in the Dark" (credited to Bruce Springsteen & The E Street Band) (4:02)
 "Brilliant Disguise" (4:15)
 "Human Touch" (5:09)
 "Streets of Philadelphia" (3:14)
 "The Ghost of Tom Joad" (4:22)
 "The Rising" (4:47)
 "Radio Nowhere" (3:18)
 "Working on a Dream" (3:28)
 "We Take Care of Our Own" (3:53)
 "Wrecking Ball" (5:49)

Release
The album was released on March 8, 2013, as an Australian Limited Tour Edition. The European Edition was released on April 15, 2013.

Charts

Weekly charts

Year-end charts

References

2013 compilation albums
Bruce Springsteen compilation albums
Columbia Records compilation albums